The 2009–10 Baylor Lady Bears women's basketball team were coached by Kim Mulkey. The Bears are a member of the Big 12 Conference and participated in the Final Four.

Offseason
April 2: The 2009 Women's Basketball Coaches Association (WBCA) High School All-America Game presented by Nike will be televised on ESPNU. Baylor Lady Bear signees Brittney Griner and Mariah Chandler are two of the 20 players selected to participate in the All-Star game.
April 7: The future stars of women’s basketball played in Saint Louis in the 2009 Women's Basketball Coaches Association (WBCA) High School All-America Game presented by Nike. State Farm/WBCA High School Player of the Year and Baylor signee Brittney Griner earned Blue Team MVP honors. She scored 20 points (9-of-15), nine rebounds, eight blocks and three steals.
April 9:  Baylor guard/forward Jessica Morrow was selected as the 27th overall pick in the 2009 WNBA draft. She became the program's seventh WNBA draftee. Morrow's selection marked the fifth straight season a Baylor player was taken in the WNBA Draft.
April 14: The Baylor Lady Bear basketball program signed Brooklyn Pope, a 6-1 forward/guard, to a Letter of Athletic Aid. Pope is a transfer from the Rutgers University, intends to begin classes at Baylor in June. Pope will sit out the 2009-10 season in order to comply with NCAA transfer rules; she will have three seasons of eligibility beginning with the 2010-11 season but is eligible to practice with the Lady Bears next year. As a freshman for the Scarlet Knight, Pope appeared in 29 of the team's 34 games and logged one start. The 6-1 forward/guard averaged 2.1 points, 2.0 rebounds and 6.0 minutes a game in 2008-09.
April 29: Sophomore Whitney Zachariason has been named to the Academic All-Big 12 first-team it was recently announced by the league office. Zachariason, a general studies major from Little Rock, Ark., maintains a 3.3 GPA.

Preseason

Regular season
Brittney Griner set numerous NCAA Division I, Big 12 Conference and Baylor records. She set a new single-season block mark with 218 and broke the NCAA Tournament blocked shot record, rejecting 35 through four tournament games.

Roster

Schedule
The Bears will participate in four notable events. On November 15, Baylor will play Tennessee in the State Farm Tip-Off Classic. From November 27 to December 5, Baylor will participate in the World Vision Classic. The Maggie Dixon Classic at Madison Square Garden will involve Baylor and Boston College on December 13. Baylor will be making its first appearance at MSG. From December 19 to December 20, the Bears will participate in the Las Vegas Hoops Classic.

|-
!colspan=9| Regular season

|-
!colspan=9| Big 12 Tournament

|-
!colspan=9| 2010 NCAA tournament

Player stats

Postseason

NCAA basketball tournament
The Lady Bears advanced to the Women's Final Four by defeating Duke 51-48. In that game, Griner set a new NCAA Woman's tournament record by getting her 31st block, breaking the old record set by Alison Bales of Duke in 2006. She currently has 35 blocks.

Awards and honors
Lindsay Palmer, Elite 88 award
Brittney Griner, Associated Press Second Team All-American
Brittney Griner, National Freshman of the Year
Brittney Griner, Memphis Regional's Most Outstanding Player
Brittney Griner, WBCA/State Farm All-Region 5 team
Brittney Griner, Big 12 Conference's Freshman of the Year
Brittney Griner, Co-Defensive Player of the Year
Brittney Griner, All-Big 12 first team
Brittney Griner, All-Big 12 All-Defensive team
Brittney Griner, All-Big 12 All-Freshman team.

Team players drafted into the WNBA

See also
2009–10 NCAA Division I women's basketball season

References

Baylor Lady Bears
Baylor Bears women's basketball seasons
NCAA Division I women's basketball tournament Final Four seasons
Baylor